Armando Romero may refer to:

 Armando Romero (equestrian) (born 1949), Mexican equestrian
 Armando Romero (painter) (born 1964), Mexican painter
 Armando Romero (footballer) (1960–2020), Mexican footballer
 Armando Romero (soccer) (born 1983), professional soccer player